{{Speciesbox
| image = Callyspongia vaginalis (Branching Vase Sponge - pink variation).jpg
| genus = Callyspongia
| parent = Callyspongia (Cladochalina)
| species = aculeata
| authority = (Linnaeus, 1759)
| synonyms =  
 Callyspongia (Cladochalina) lineata (Duchassaing & Michelotti, 1864) 
 Callyspongia (Cladochalina) papyracea (Schmidt, 1870) 
 Callyspongia (Cladochalina) vaginalis (Lamarck, 1814)
 Callyspongia (Spinosella) vaginalis (Lamarck, 1814) 
 Callyspongia simplex (Duchassaing & Michelotti, 1864) 
 Callyspongia vaginalis (Lamarck, 1814)
 Siphonochalina papyracea Schmidt, 1870 
 Spinosella maxima Dendy, 1887 
 Spinosella sororia (Duchassaing & Michelotti, 1864) 
 Spinosella vaginalis (Lamarck, 1814) 
 Spinosella velata Dendy, 1887 
 Spongia bursaria Lamarck, 1814 
 Spongia clavaherculis Duchassaing & Michelotti, 1864 
 Spongia vaginalis Lamarck, 1814 
 Tuba bursaria (Lamarck, 1814) 
 Tuba irregularis Duchassaing & Michelotti, 1864 
 Tuba lineata Duchassaing & Michelotti, 1864 
 Tuba megastoma Duchassaing & Michelotti, 1864 
 Tuba sagoti Duchassaing & Michelotti, 1864 
 Tuba sanctaecrucis Duchassaing & Michelotti, 1864 
 Tuba simplex Duchassaing & Michelotti, 1864 
 Tuba sororia Duchassaing & Michelotti, 1864 
 Tuba subenervia Duchassaing & Michelotti, 1864 
 Tuba tortolensis Duchassaing & Michelotti, 1864 
 Tuba vaginalis (Lamarck, 1814)

}}Callyspongia (Cladochalina) aculeata, commonly known as the branching vase sponge is a species of Porifora, meaning sea sponge, in the family Callyspongiidae. Poriferans are typically characterized by ostia, pores that filter out plankton, with an osculum as the opening which water leaves through, and choanocytes trap food particles. 

This species is frequently colonized by Parazoanthus parasiticus, a colonial anemone, and Ophiothrix suensonii, a brittle star. It feeds on plankton and detritus. The color of C. aculeata is variable, ranging from red to orange, lavender to brownish-gray, greenish-gray, and sometimes light tan.

 Defining Traits Callyspongia aculeata usually has a tubular growth pattern, although the magnitude of the current affects its growth form. The dominant morphotypes are tubular elongated and tubular vaciform. The long, erect tubes taper slightly and have a wide vent up to 2.5 cm in diameter with a thin wall. The sponge has very elastic tubes that vary in length and can stand singly or with other tubes. The sponge is rough with its irregular pits and nubs covering its surface. The species is found on hard surfaces, usually reef plateaus and deep reef slopes.

Among two branching species, Callyspongia (Callyspongia) pedroi and Callyspongia (Cladochalina) alcoladoi were compared through their skeletons along the Cuban coast.

 Distribution Callyspongia aculeata lives in the area of the Caribbean, Florida, Bermuda, and the Bahamas. It grows at a temperature of 20°-24 °C. The Atlanto-Caribbean's tubular sponges are from Australia. Research about sponge-dwelling fauna in the Gulf of Mexico concluded that Callyspongia Aculeata was the host species with the second highest guest dwelling species, including 20 associated species such as amphipods, although not all the sponges have the same associated fauna. There are 34 sponge dwelling species found abundant in the Caribbean sea and the Gulf of Mexico. Callyspongia aculeata has also been seen living among competitive Tubastraea on the Ceara coast.Callyspongia is a relatively new species to science, but within a study detailing the Cuban mesophotic coral ecosystems, data of two species of Callyspongia were collected. The genus Callyspongia grows in shallow reefs with high benthic diversity. Among the Cuban Porifora, eight Callyspongia species make up the top five species richness in this area. These species were found to extend to a greater deepness in the reef.

The brittlestar, Ophiothrix lineata can occupy the same habitat as Callyspongia vaginalis, a species within the genus of Callyspongia. Additionally, the amphipods have been found to have high gene flow among the Florida reef area because the amphipods Leucothoe kensleyi and Leucothoe ashleyae occupy the host sponge.

 Ecological Role 
Callyspongia has been found to have a high host and guest interaction richness among tropical reefs in the Cariibean and the Gulf of Mexico. However, little research has been conducted as to dwelling fauna taxonomic identity within these interactions. Sponge dwelling species have a complex interaction with Callyspongia, as there has been an interest expressed in studying more niche-modelling approaches.

As Callyspongia vaginalis can be the host for amphipods and the brittlestar, there is high gene flow for the brittlestar and amphipods on the coastline of the Florida reef system. Where Callyspongia is located influences this and the genetic connectivity of the species.

Among two branching species, Callyspongia (Callyspongia) pedroi and Callyspongia (Cladochalina) alcoladoi were compared through their skeletons along the Cuban coast.

 Morphology 
Through anastomosis, the sponge can become linked. Porifera are suspension feeders, meaning they can filter plankton and other microorganisms through its osculum. Porifera contain choanocytes, pinacocytes, and archeocytes. The structure of the choanocyte being a singular flagellum surrounded by microvilli is a characteristic of most porifera which allows water to enter. This canal system, however, differs within Demospongia because the choanocyte chambers differ. The branching vase sponge has been found to have a symbiotic relationship with the brittlestar, Ophiothrix lineata. Recent research has suggested that this relationship may be more parasitic as the brittlestar feeds on sponge larvae, resulting in a decrease in sponge fitness. The limiting factors of the population of the brittlestar are unclear, but larvae predation has been found with 85% of sponges containing the presence of brittlestars.

Among the class Demospongiae, skeletons are formed mainly of spongin. Spongin is the main component that makes up the sponge skeleton. While sponges lack defined organ systems, the tissue is composed of pinacocytes and choanocytes, two types of cells on the sponge surface. In terms of structure, large branching erect sponges are prone to toppling during storms, while smaller sponges remained higher in biomass after storm events. In hurricanes, surviving sponges were found to have different silica in their fiber skeletons. Sponges with a larger openings and smaller bases are less prone to breakage and live easier in shallower water than sponges with thin, narrow branches.

Sponges are hermaphroditic, and members of demospongiae can develop sexually produced larvae or from asexual fragments. Asexual fragmentation happens when one species divides into smaller segments and sponges may be more successful at asexually reproducing, because they don't need sexually generated larvae. Additionally, they can spread through larger areas faster so their dispersion rate is increased. Considering environmental circumstances, sponges are able to undergo fragmentation as a survival strategy in disturbed states. Although Callyspongia aculeata has not been studyed in depth, Callyspongia diffusa in the genus was found to have a spicular skeleton encased in spongin.

 Feeding 
Within the interaction between the brittlestar and reef sponge, the deposit feeding strategies of Ophiothrix lineata might increase growth and reproduction within Callyspongia vaginalis. However, a study showed that this relationship may not be completely true, as O. lineata feeds on larvae of the sponge.

The difference in choanocyte chambers within Demospongia result in different strategies for food capture. In Callyspongia diffusa, the choanocytes have been found to be primary for particle capture before digesting it. The mesohylcells are responsible for then digesting food.

As evolutionary history is not clear on Callyspongia aculeata, through researching species under the genus Callyspongia''there can be made efforts on finding possibly similar functions and feeding strategies. Furthermore, research can help create a possible more detailed analysis of anatomical processes and cells from this sponge species.

References

External links
Friday Fellow: Branching Vase Sponge at Earthling Nature.

Callyspongiidae
Fauna of the Southeastern United States
Animals described in 1814